Arthur J. Stone (1847–1938), a leading American silversmith, was born, trained and worked in Sheffield, England, and Edinburgh, Scotland, before travelling to the United States in 1884. He was one of the last silversmiths in America to train apprentices to carry out designs in hand-wrought silver. In 1901, Stone set up a workshop in Gardner, Massachusetts which operated under his name until its sale in 1937 to Henry Heywood. Heywood was a Gardner businessman, who renamed it The Stone Silver Shop, and later, Stone Associates. Heywood died in 1945. His sons Henry, Jr. and Jerome ran Stone Associates until 1957.

One of the silversmiths in Arthur Stone's shop was George Porter Blanchard, father of silversmith Porter Blanchard.

References

External links

Work examples and makers' marks
Samples of his work
Samples of his work
Article on Stone silver
Notes on his career and a picture of him at work

1847 births
1938 deaths
Artists from Sheffield
American silversmiths
British emigrants to the United States